The Western Oregon Indian Termination Act or Public Law 588, was passed in August 1954 as part of the United States Indian termination policy. It called for the termination of federal supervision over the trust and restricted property of numerous Native American bands and small tribes, all located west of the Cascade Mountains in Oregon.
The act also called for disposition of federally owned property which had been bought for the administration of Indian affairs, and for termination of federal services which these Indians received under federal recognition. The stipulations in this act were similar to those of most termination acts.

Tribes and bands
The Western Oregon Indian Termination Act was unique because of the number of tribes it affected. In all, 61 tribes in Western Oregon were terminated, more than the total tribes terminated under all other individual acts. However, it appears that authorities named every tribe that had been named in various treaties over the years. A review of the 1890 and 1930 censuses shows that several of the named tribes in the termination act reported no members. In addition, the history of the area, with the Coastal Reservation being established by Executive Order and not treaty, then separated into the Siletz and Grande Ronde Reservations, then those two reservations being combined, and yet again separated, makes the situation complicated and difficult to ascertain specific data.

The 1930 census report notes that there were people who reported that they were Indian but did not denote a tribe in almost every state. In addition, it combines groups into language stock and tribes; however, "tribe" may reflect all speakers rather than separate bands and tribes. The total number of Indians affiliated with the language groups were as follows:
Athapaskan (1930= 504; 1910 =656) 
Chinookan (1930= 561; 1910 =897)
Kalapooian (1930= 45; 1910 = 106)
Kusan (1930= 107; 1910 =93)
Salish (1930= 9; 1910 = 18)
Shastan (1930= 138; 1910 =177)
Waiilatpuan (1930= 193; 1910 =302) 
Yakonan (1930= 7; 1910 =55) 
The totals in Oregon for 1930 were 1,564. In comparison, the numbers for the 1910 census for these same groups represented a population of 2,304. On June 22, 1956, the final roll of the Confederated Tribes of Siletz contained 929 names. On April 14, 1956, the Federal Register published the final roll of the Confederated Tribes of Grand Ronde which contained 862 names. The combined total of these two confederations' population was 1,791, though there may well have been scattered native peoples in the coastal region who were not affiliated with these reservations.

Restoration acts
There were five restoration acts that restored all of the bands who had tribe members that had been located on the Grand Ronde or Silez Reservations. Some of these tribes were restored with those acts and later obtained their own federal recognition.

The Chinook Indian Nation is made up of the five westernmost Tribes of Chinookan peoples, Lower Chinook, Willapa and Wahkiakum in Washington State plus Clatsop and Cathlamet in Oregon. The Chinook Nation is seeking Tribal recognition.

See also
California Rancheria Termination Act

References

Aboriginal title in the United States
.W
Native American law
United States federal Indian policy
1954 in Oregon
1954 in American law
1954 in politics
1954 in the United States
Assimilation of indigenous peoples of North America
History of Oregon
History of the Pacific Northwest
History of indigenous peoples of North America
History of the West Coast of the United States
Native American history
Native American tribes in Oregon
Native Americans in Oregon
Political history of the United States
20th century in Oregon